Ojo de Liebre Lagoon (also known as Scammon's Lagoon), translated into English as "hare eye lagoon", is a coastal lagoon located in Mulegé Municipality near the town of Guerrero Negro in the northwestern Baja California Sur state of Mexico. It lies approximately halfway between the southern tip of the Baja California Peninsula and the U.S.-Mexico border, opening onto the Pacific Ocean.

The lagoon is within the Vizcaíno Biosphere Reserve UNESCO World Heritage Site, and is a Ramsar wetlands site. It also is the site of the biggest commercial saltworks plant in the world. It is an important habitat  for the reproduction and wintering of the gray whale and harbor seal, as well as other marine mammals including the California sea lion, northern elephant seal and blue whale. Four species of endangered marine turtles reproduce there. It is an important refuge for waterfowl in the winter.

Encompassing  both a UNESCO World Heritage Site and a major salt plant, Laguna Ojo de Liebre embodies the diverse worlds of natural habitat and industrialization.

Tourism, now closely controlled, was formerly a threat to the gray whales.

Geography

Relatively deep channels cut through the lagoon between its broad intertidal flats. The climate is  dry and warm; the annual temperature ranges from 18 °C and 22 °C. Annual rainfall can vary from none to 200 mm.

Geology
Geological studies indicated that Laguna Ojo de Liebre began as a pocket beach  on the coastal plain of Baja California at a time when the ocean was some 12 meters  lower than today's level. Tidal changes resulted in the formation of inlets   and sediment from nearby river gradually built a barrier to form the lagoon.

Salt works
Industrialization is leaving its mark on the lagoon and surrounding area. There is a rectangular evaporation pond for the harvesting of salt, some large salt flats, and other barriers and channels built to enclose and flood shallow brine pans on the eastern side of the lagoon (yellow-greenish in color in the picture at right ).

The Ojo de Liebre lagoon has the biggest saltworks plant in the world – Exportadora de Sal S.A. (ESSA). The company makes salt from seawater which is pumped into concentration ponds measuring 33,000 hectares. The salt plant creates an effluent called bittern (a liquor remaining after salt-boiling) that is discharged into the lagoon. In December 1997, 94 green turtles were found dead weeks after the company discharged bitterns into the lagoon. The bitterns were investigated for fluoride content and were found to contain over 100 mg per liter. ESSA had earlier claimed that the bitterns contained the same salts present as seawater, only more concentrated (20-fold).
F- was found to be 60.5 times higher than F- in sea water.

History
In December 1857, Charles Melville Scammon, in the brig Boston, accompanied by the schooner-tender Marin, under Lefft, first entered Laguna Ojo de Liebre to hunt the gray whales breeding there. They caught twenty. Scammon returned to the lagoon the next winter (1858–59), this time with the bark Ocean Bird and the schooner-tenders A.M. Simpson and Kate, under Easton and Hale. He caught forty-seven cows, which produced  of oil. He was accompanied by six other vessels (five barks and one schooner), which obtained an additional  of oil (about 150 whales). A high of eleven vessels visited the lagoon in the winter of 1859-60, but they obtained considerably less oil— (c. 140 whales). When the bark Louisa visited the lagoon in the winter of 1872-73 she only obtained  of oil. It was abandoned after that.

See also

References

External links

UNESCO World Heritage Sites: Whale Sanctuary of El Vazcaino, Mexico

Lagoons of Mexico
Landforms of Baja California Sur
Mulegé Municipality
Pacific Coast of Mexico
Protected areas of Baja California Sur
Ramsar sites in Mexico
Saltworks
World Heritage Sites in Mexico
Important Bird Areas of Mexico